Swedish Match (also known as Nokia, Avant) is a Volvo Ocean 60 yacht that competed in the 1997–98 Whitbread Round the World Race.

Career
Swedish Match was designed by Bruce Farr and built by Cookson Boats.

Swedish Match competed in the 1997–98 Whitbread Round the World Race and finished 3rd. She was skippered by Gunnar Krantz.

She was given a new name, Nokia, and competed in the 1999 Sydney to Hobart Yacht Race. She won line honours in the 1999 Sydney to Hobart Yacht Race skippered by Stefan Myralf and Michael Spies. The winning time, 1 day, 19 hours, 48 minutes, and 2 seconds stood as a record until Wild Oats XI beat it in the 2005 edition.

In 2003, she competed in the Volvo Baltic Race under the name Avant.

References

1990s sailing yachts
Sailing yachts designed by Bruce Farr
Sailing yachts of Denmark
Sailing yachts of Sweden
Volvo Ocean Race yachts
Sydney to Hobart Yacht Race yachts
Volvo Ocean 60 yachts